Nawab Qasim Jan was a courtier in the royal courts of Mughal Delhi. He first lived in Lahore, attached to the court of the Governor, Moin-ul-Mulk, in the 1750s, thereafter he moved to Delhi, and joined the court of Delhi, in reign of Mughal Emperor, Shah Alam II (r. 1728–1806).

Soon he was given the title of Nawab, and given the region of and thereafter he built his home close to Red Fort, in Ballimaran, Delhi, in the lane that is still known as Gali Kasim Jan, and also built mosque nearby known as Qasim Khani Mosque. He had two brothers, Alam Jan and Arif Jan, whose son, Ahmad Baksh Khan, later founded the princely state of Loharu (now in Bhiwani district) in 1806. Noted Urdu poet, Mirza Ghalib was married to Umrao Begum, daughter of Nawab Ilahi Bakhsh Khan (younger brother of the first Nawab of Loharu, Ahmad Baksh Khan).

His son, Nawab Faizullah Beg, was a courtier in Bahadur Shah Zafar's reign, and built a complex later known as Ahata Kaley Sahab, so named a saint named Kaley Khan, who lived here for a while, after whom Delhi's Sarai Kale Khan is named. The complex was later acquired by Bunyadi Begum, poet Mirza Ghalib's sister-in-law, and housed the poet after he was released from debtors' prison.

Though according to other sources he came from Yarkand (present day Xijiazhuang Province in China) in 1811 he was awarded the title Khan and Hateen Province near Gurgaon by the then King of Delhi, Shah Alamgir.

Descendants
Some of the prominent people who are linked to Qasim Jan lineage are Nawab of Loharu, Fakhruddin Ali Ahmed and Mirza Ghalib, whereas his own descendants were:

 Son: Mirza Shakir Hussain Barlas (Barrister at Law)
 Wife: Bibi Mehmooda Begum (Daughter of Nawab Amjad Ali Shah of Sardhana, last Nawab of Sardhana) sister of Sirdar Ikbal Ali Shah
Daughter: Halima Barlas                                                                                                                                                                                                            
 Daughter: Nafisa Barlas wife of M.Sultan Yar Khan, Advocate/Member of Delhi Legislative Assembly (1952–56) their son Naved Yar Khan a well-known activist, among others, demanded restoration of Kohinoor diamond to India from England and the Peacock Throne from Iran, has contested various public interest litigations, including that of sensitive Babri Masjid-Ram janam Bhoomi case in which undertaking by Chief Minister of Uttar Pradesh then Kalyan Singh led to his conviction for Contempt of Supreme Court of India*** Daughter: Aquila Barlas Later known as Dr. Aquila Kiani
 Son: Khalid Kiani
 Son: Sohail Kiani
 Daughter: Lina Kiani  
 Daughter: Naema Barlas Later known as Doctor N.B. Matuk
 Son: Nawab Mirza Aqil Hussain Barlas
 Wife: Bibi Mehtabunnisa Begum (Daughter of the Grand Vazier of Alwar)
 Wife: Nusrat Barlas
 Son: Nawab Mirza Adil Hussain Barlas
Wife: Rukhsana Barlas
Daughter: Adila Barlas
Daughter: Ayat Barlas
Son: Nawab Mirza Danyaal Hussain Barlas
Son: Nawab Mirza Aahil Hussain Barlas
Daughter: Zeisha Barlas

References

Nawabs of India
History of Delhi